Seatruck Ferries is a UK-based freight-only ferry company which commenced services in 1996. It is a subsidiary of CLdN. It operates out of four ports on the Irish Sea, including Heysham and Liverpool.

History

Seatruck was established in 1996, operating one ship, between Heysham, Lancashire, England and Warrenpoint, County Down, Northern Ireland. She was joined in April 1997 by sister ship , which was also operated on the Heysham to Warrenpoint service, a service which continues today as a two-ship service.

In 2002, the company was acquired by the Clipper Group. Also in 2002, European Mariner was chartered for two months, before moving on to Color Line.

In 2005, Seatruck Ferries ordered its first new ships, five "P Series" ro-ro freight ferries, however only four were built. These vessels were named Clipper Point, Clipper Panorama, Clipper Pace and Clipper Pennant. All four vessels were built by Spanish shipyard Astilleros de Huelva.

These are now deployed on charters to Caledonian MacBrayne, NorthLink Ferries and the Isle of Man Steam Packet Company respectively.

In 2007, Seatruck chartered the Celtic Star, which was deployed on the Liverpool to Dublin route.

In January 2008, the company's pioneering ship, Riverdance, ran aground in Blackpool. Seatruck chartered Phocine to cover Riverdances services until Clipper Point entered service. Attempts to refloat the vessel failed, and she was broken up in situ in the summer of 2008. In March 2008, Clipper Point became the company's first new ferry, entering service on the Heysham to Warrenpoint route. Panorama followed in January 2009, Pace in March 2009 and Pennant in October 2009.

In March 2008, the same month that Clipper Point entered service, Seatruck Ferries placed an order for four RoRo 2200 ferries to be built by Flensburger Schiffbau-Gesellschaft in Germany.

The first two of these vessels launched in late 2011, named Seatruck Progress and Seatruck Power, whilst the third, Seatruck Performance, launched in January 2012. The final ship of the class, Seatruck Precision, launched in March 2012. Progress entered service in December 2011, Power joined the fleet in February 2012, Performance joined the fleet in April 2012  and lastly Precision will join the fleet before mid-2012.

In late 2011, one of the earlier "P Series" vessels, Clipper Panorama, was renamed Seatruck Panorama whilst Clipper Pace was renamed Seatruck Pace in February 2012.

In 2015, Ole Frie stepped down as chairman of the board. Kristian Morch was appointed as Frie's replacement. Alistair Eagles was also appointed CEO of Seatruck.

In May 2015, Clipper Ranger finished her long-term charter with Caledonian MacBrayne. The Clipper Point also finished her charter with DFDS. She was then chartered to Inter Shipping (Spain) to operate on the company's Algeciras–Tanger Med II route.

In March 2019, both Helliar and Hildasay were sold to Caledonian Maritime Assests Limited for continued use on the Serco NorthLink freight route Aberdeen - Kirkwall - Lerwick.

In December 2019, Clipper Ranger was sold to Coopérative de Transport Maritime et Aérien (CTMA) for $11.5 million. This was after being on charter to them since July 2019.

In September 2022, Arrow, was sold to Isle of Man Steampacket Company, after being on charter to them for many years. This meant the last of the R Class freight ferries were sold out of Seatruck.

In September 2022, the business was purchased by CLdN of Belgium with eight vessels.

Routes
Seatruck currently operate three routes on the Irish Sea, serving four ports.

 Heysham–Warrenpoint
 Heysham–Dublin
 Liverpool–Dublin

Fleet

Current fleet
Seatruck currently have eight vessels, most of which are in service for Seatruck.

Former fleet
These are vessels that have previously been operated or chartered by Seatruck.

References

External links 

2022 mergers and acquisitions
Shipping companies of the United Kingdom
Transport companies established in 1996
1996 establishments in England